Paul Blake is the current Chairman of the British Basketball League, succeeding Vince Macaulay-Razaq in 2005, as well as working as the current Managing Director of the Newcastle Eagles basketball franchise.

He attended Northumbria University in Newcastle upon Tyne.

References

Living people
Alumni of Northumbria University
Basketball in England
Year of birth missing (living people)
Newcastle Eagles
English sports executives and administrators
Basketball executives